Microlepidium is a genus of flowering plants belonging to the family Brassicaceae.

Its native range is Southern Australia.

Species
Species:

Microlepidium alatum 
Microlepidium pilosulum

References

Brassicaceae
Brassicaceae genera